Uwe Grabe (born 15 October 1942) is a German athlete. He competed in the men's shot put at the 1968 Summer Olympics.

References

1942 births
Living people
Athletes (track and field) at the 1968 Summer Olympics
German male shot putters
Olympic athletes of East Germany
Place of birth missing (living people)
Universiade bronze medalists for East Germany
Universiade medalists in athletics (track and field)
Medalists at the 1970 Summer Universiade